The 1967 Koynanagar earthquake occurred near Koynanagar town in Maharashtra, India on 11 December local time. The magnitude 6.6 shock hit with a maximum Mercalli intensity of VIII (Severe). It occurred near the site of Koyna dam, raising questions about induced seismicity, and claimed at least 177 lives and injured over 2,200.

Damage
More than 80% of the houses were damaged in Koyana Nagar Township, but it did not cause any major damage to the dam except some cracks which were quickly repaired. There have been several earthquakes of smaller magnitude there since 1967. Some geologists believe that the earthquake was due to reservoir-triggered seismic activity, but senior project officials have repeatedly denied this conclusion.

See also 
 List of earthquakes in 1967
 List of earthquakes in India

References

External links 

1967 Koynangar
Koynanagar Earthquake, 1967
History of Maharashtra (1947–present)
Koynanagar Earthquake, 1967
1967 disasters in India